The 1989–90 UC Santa Barbara Gauchos men's basketball team represented the University of California, Santa Barbara during the 1989–90 college basketball season. They were led by head coach Jerry Pimm in his 7th season at UCSB. The Gauchos were members of the Big West Conference and played their home games at the UC Santa Barbara Events Center, also known as The Thunderdome.

UCSB finished the season 21–9, 13–5 in Big West play to finish third in the conference regular season standings. They received an at-large bid to the NCAA tournament. As the No. 9 seed in the Southeast Region, they beat Houston in the first round before losing to No. 1 seed Michigan State in the second round.

The season was a memorable one for UCSB fans. The 1989–90 team beat eventual National champion UNLV in front of a raucous crown at The Thunderdome on February 26, 1990. It would end up being UNLV's only loss over a stretch of 55 games between the 1989–90 and 1990–91 seasons. The Gauchos also won the first NCAA Tournament game in school history.

Roster

Schedule and results

|-
!colspan=9 style=| Regular season

|-
!colspan=9 style=|Big West tournament

|-
!colspan=9 style=|NCAA tournament

References

Uc Santa Barbara
Uc Santa Barbara
UC Santa Barbara Gauchos men's basketball seasons